Berg im Drautal is a village and municipality in the district of Spittal an der Drau in the Austrian state of Carinthia.

Geography 
It is situated in Drava Valley forty kilometers western from Spittal. The municipality is situated between the Gailtaler Alpen in south and the Kreuzeck group in north. The field of community lies on the Drautal Straße (B 100) road, which connects Berg with Spittal an der Drau (c. 40 km towards east) and Lienz in Osttirol (c. 35 km westerly).

References

Cities and towns in Spittal an der Drau District
Kreuzeck group
Gailtal Alps